Northern Comfort is a 2023 comedy film directed by Hafsteinn Gunnar Sigurðsson in his English language debut. Co-written by the director with Halldór Laxness Halldórsson and Tobias Munthe, the film stars Timothy Spall and Lydia Leonard. It had its world premiere at the SXSW Film Festival in March 2023.

Synopsis
A collection of people with a fear of flying have attended a fear of flying course but are left stranded in Iceland after suffering turbulence and engine failure on their aeroplane.

Cast
Timothy Spall as Edward
Lydia Leonard as Sarah
Ella Rumpf as Coco
Sverrir Gudnason as Alphons
Simon Manyonda as Charles
Björn Hlynur Haraldsson as Dries
Rob Delaney as Ralph
Emun Elliot as Tom
Gina Bramhill

Production
Sigurdsson told Deadline Hollywood that he was inspired to write the film about participants on a fear of flying course after he “heard about these courses because there was someone close to me that had this problem. I found it quite fascinating and wanted to use it as a vehicle or metaphor to make a film kind of an existential comedy about big themes, like fear and death and life”. Sigurdsson wrote the screenplay with Halldor Laxness Halldorsson and Tobias Munthe. Producers are Grimar Jonsson via Netop Films, with Mike Goodridge of Good Chaos and Sol Bondy and Fred Burle of One Two Films as co-producers. Principal photography on the production started in February 2022. Filming locations included Mývatn, Reykjavik, the UK and France. Charades handled world sales with Film4 taking UK free TV rights, and Scanbox having pre-bought Nordic rights.

Release
The film has its premiere at the SXSW Film Festival in Austin, Texas on March 12, 2023.

Reception
Alissa Simon in Variety wrote that “Sigurðsson shows that he has the chops to work internationally should he choose to”, and praised cinematographer Niels Thastum use of “tight framing to up the claustrophobia quotient of the film’s many enclosed spaces” that “should look fine on screens both big and small” and praised composer Daníel Bjarnson for his “peppy score” which “captures the characters’ tension and fears”.

References

External links

Films shot in Iceland
2023 films
Films by Icelandic directors
English-language Icelandic films